L'Institut is a French hip hop collective, established in 2005 as an offshoot of Sexion d'Assaut, and associated with Wati B. L'institut was formed by various rap and hip hop / freestyle acts mostly coming from 9th arrondissement in Paris. L'Institut released the collective album Equipe de nuit in June 2013 that included in addition various collaborations with L.I.O. Pétrodollars, S.Pri Noir and Shin Sekaï. The group was dissolved in 2014, despite encouraging initial success with various band members concentrating on solo projects and collaborations.

Members of the collective notably Dr. Beriz, Insolent and Abou Debeing have also had many separate releases, collaborations and chart success in their own right.

Members
Abou Debeing  and Docteur Beriz (sometimes Docteur Berize, Dr. Beriz) are two prominent founding members of L'Institut.

Although there were a number of changes, other main acts associated to L'Institut were Dadif, L'Insolent, Le H de Guerre, John Kafé and L.A.S

Abou Debeing
Abou Debeing (sometimes Abou 2being) (real name Abou Kevin Kamara, born 19 April 1989) is a French rapper from the 15e arrondissement de Paris. He is born to immigrants from Ivory Coast origin. Being denotes France in Ivorian slang, so Debeing means French or of France. Being dubbed Debeing from young age, he adapted his name to release his solo album Debeinguerie in February 2017 and released his second album Street Love in 2019. He started freestyling at age 16, he was admitted to Wati B label in 2010. His first major success was through a collaboration with Black M in "Adios". He launched his sound "Taçatwa", a homage to the French capital Paris. He has collaborations with Sexion d'Assaut, Dadju, Black M, Naza, Aya Nakamura, KeBlack, Lartiste and many others.

Dr. Beriz
Dr Bériz or Docteur Bériz  (born 1 April 1990) is the artistic name of Mourtada Alladji Coulibaly  grew up in the 9e arrondissement in Paris. He was signed to the Wati B label. After leaving the label, he released "Acquitté" in preparation for a new album in 2019.

Discography

Albums

Discography (members)

Abou Debeing
Albums

Charting songs

Featured in

Dr. Beriz
Albums

Featured in

References

Musical collectives